Macrotomoxia is a genus of beetles in the family Mordellidae, containing the following species:

 Macrotomoxia castanea Píc, 1922
 Macrotomoxia palpalis (Kônô, 1935)

References

Mordellidae